James Brian Clouston OBE  (born 1935) [1] is a British landscape architect, and founder of Brian Clouston and Partners (BCP) once one of the largest landscape architecture practices in Europe.

Clouston was trained at the Royal Botanic Gardens in Edinburgh and at the University of Newcastle. He is a past President of the Landscape Institute, the UK professional body for landscape architecture.  
Clouston started his professional career at Durham Council Council in 1960 but left in 1965 establishing BCP. The practice undertook large scale coal mine pit heap and derelict land reclamation projects in England in the 1960s and 1970s culminating in work on the reclamation of the Liverpool International Garden Festival (which as president of the Landscape Institute he had lobbied for) and Willow Tree Lane landfill reclamation project in Hillingdon, NW London.

In the 1970s his practice worked on landscape and reclamation projects throughout the Middle East, in particular in Jeddah and Riyadh in Saudi Arabia.  In the late 1970s Clouston established an office in Hong Kong which was managed by Alan Tate from which many large scale Landscape Design projects were completed, notably at Sha Tin Town Park.  Additional offices were opened in Singapore, Kuala Lumpur and in Sydney.  In the late 1980s the United Kingdom part of Clouston's company merged with RPS PLC, Clouston being Chairman until 1993. In the 1990s he pursued property development and was director of a number of property companies in the north of England [1] .

He was appointed OBE in the 1990 Birthday Honours.

Books
Brian Clouston is the author/editor of the following books:
 Landscape Design with Plants, Van Nostrand Reinhold, 1977
 After the elm... edited by Brian Clouston & Kathy Stansfield, William Heinemann, 1979
 Landscape by Design, William Heinemann, 1980 (with Tony Aldous)
 Trees in Towns: Maintenance and Management, Architectural Press, 1981 (with Kathy Stansfield)

References
 1.^"http://company-director-check.co.uk/director/905654076

English landscape architects
British landscape architects
Alumni of Newcastle University
Officers of the Order of the British Empire
Living people
1935 births